Agustín Mateo Falótico (born 22 February 1998) is an Argentine professional footballer who plays as a forward for Deportivo Español.

Career
Falótico, who holds Italian nationality, began his career in Argentina with Deportivo Español. He made his professional debut on 22 September 2018 during a goalless draw in Primera B Metropolitana to Flandria, with the forward replacing Nicolás Lugli after seventy-eight minutes. His opening start came in a home defeat to Barracas Central in the succeeding October, which preceded his first senior goal arriving during a 2–3 win away to Sacachispas on 13 April 2019.

Career statistics
.

References

External links

1998 births
Living people
Place of birth missing (living people)
Argentine people of Italian descent
Argentine footballers
Association football forwards
Primera B Metropolitana players
Deportivo Español footballers